Arthur Willis (2 February 1920 – 7 November 1987) was a professional footballer who played for Tottenham Hotspur, Swansea City, Haverfordwest and England.

Football career 
Willis joined Spurs from Finchley F.C. in January 1944. He was a principal player in the push and run Championship winning side of 1950-51 when he featured in 39 games. Playing a total of 160 times and scoring one goal in all competitions for the club between 1946 and 1954 in the position of full back. Willis left Spurs in September 1954 in a transfer deal which took him to Swansea Town where he went on to make 96 appearances. He finished his career as player–manager for Haverfordwest County AFC.

England career 
Willis played once for the national team in 1951 against France.

Honours 
Tottenham Hotspur

Football League First Division Winners: 1950–51

Football League Second Division
Winners: 1949-50

External links

Top spurs A-Z of players since 1908

References 

1920 births
1987 deaths
People from Conisbrough
Footballers from Doncaster
England international footballers
English footballers
English Football League players
Tottenham Hotspur F.C. players
Swansea City A.F.C. players
Haverfordwest County A.F.C. players
Association football defenders
Haverfordwest County A.F.C. managers
People educated at Sexey's School
English football managers